The 1903 Utah Agricultural Aggies football team was an American football team that represented Utah Agricultural College (later renamed Utah State University) during the 1903 college football season. In their second season under head coach George P. Campbell, the Aggies compiled a 3–0 record and outscored their opponents by a total of 78 to 0. The season included the first game in the Utah State–Wyoming football rivalry with the Aggies defeating the Cowboys, 46–0, at Logan, Utah.

Schedule

References

Utah Agricultural
Utah State Aggies football seasons
College football undefeated seasons
Utah Agricultural Aggies football